WMSS (91.1 FM, "Super 91") is a high school-operated high school radio station serving the Harrisburg, Pennsylvania, metropolitan area, licensed to Middletown and owned by the Middletown Area School District. The station serves as a training ground for high school students and offers a block format.

History
On April 5, 1978, the Middletown Area School District was granted a construction permit for a new 10-watt radio station, which began broadcasting on October 2, 1978. John Cooper and Jeff Johnston were teachers at the Feaser Middle School and started the radio station. They were assisted by teachers Mary Bigelow and Maureen Denis. WMSS raised power two years later to 150 watts. By the late 80's, it was a 500 watt 
mono station. Former student and Asst. G-M John Wilsbach took over the reigns from John Cooper in 1992.  The station raised power to 1350 watts. On November 1, 1995, the station changed to "Stereo". When Feaser Middle School was demolished in 2007, the station moved to the new Middletown Area Middle School January 3, 2008. Because of new tower height, its power was actually lowered to 450 watts. In late 2018, the station completed a construction permit to go to a 4-bay, 5500 watt directional signal. The station is operated by General Manager John Wilsbach (former student), Faculty Advisor Brian Keyser (former student) and Engineer Tim Starliper (former student). Some notable WMSS graduates include Sweeny Murti (WFAN), Mike Ondayko (98 Rock), Jeni Gipe (WRVV), Scott Green (WTPA), and Dan Magaro (CBS-21). Numerous others have gone into careers in the music industry, legal, technical, I-T, public relations, public service, print media, health care, military, educational, and transportation industries.

Programming
WMSS airs a variety of music formats.

On weekday mornings (from 6 AM to 3 PM), the station airs a unique hybrid of Soft Adult Contemporary/Easy Listening, mainstream Adult Contemporary, and Rhythmic Adult Contemporary formats, generally focusing on material from the 1960s to the 1990s, including very little post-2000 music. This programming segment features a high percentage of songs that were major or moderate hits from the 1970s through 1990s but are essentially "forgotten" today—hence the relatively high prevalence of easy listening songs, as this genre has been abandoned by mainstream AC stations.

After 3 PM on weekdays, and other afternoon times on weekends, the station broadcasts an alternative music format.

On Saturday mornings (from 7 AM - 12 PM, extended to 4 PM in the summer) and in select time slots on Sunday mornings, the station broadcasts an oldies format with general manager John Wilsbach as the DJ; this is known as the "All Oldies Saturday" and features material exclusively from the 1950s and 1960s, particularly prior to 1964. The station also airs live sports coverage of local high school athletics, Lebanon Valley College athletics, and local church services. It airs numerous educational programs and public service announcements.

References

External links
 
 

MSS
High school radio stations in the United States
Dauphin County, Pennsylvania
Radio stations established in 1978